John Good (died 2 April 1941) was an Irish politician and company director.

He contested the 1918 general election for the Irish Unionist Alliance in Dublin Pembroke, polling second behind Desmond FitzGerald, an abstentionist candidate for Sinn Féin. He topped the poll in the East Ward at the 1920 Pembroke Urban District Council election.

He was elected to Dáil Éireann as a Businessmen's Party Teachta Dála (TD) for the Dublin County constituency at the 1923 general election. He was re-elected at the June 1927, September 1927, 1932 and 1933 general elections as an independent TD. He did not contest the 1937 general election.

References

Year of birth missing
1941 deaths
Independent TDs
Members of the 4th Dáil
Members of the 5th Dáil
Members of the 6th Dáil
Members of the 7th Dáil
Members of the 8th Dáil
Politicians from County Dublin
Business and Professional Group TDs